Sultanbek Astanuly Astanov (Sūltanbek Astanūly Astanov; born 23 March 1999) is a Kazakhstani football player. He plays for Ordabasy on loan from Kairat.

International career
He made his debut for Kazakhstan national football team on 16 November 2021 in a friendly against Tajikistan.

References

External links
 
 

1999 births
People from Shymkent
Living people
Kazakhstani footballers
Kazakhstan youth international footballers
Kazakhstan under-21 international footballers
Kazakhstan international footballers
Association football forwards
FC Kairat players
FC Ordabasy players
Kazakhstan First Division players
Kazakhstan Premier League players